Sinochlora is a genus of Asian bush crickets of the tribe Holochlorini within the subfamily Phaneropterinae. Species have been recorded from China, Taiwan, Korea, Japan, and Vietnam.

Species 
The Orthoptera Species File lists:

References 

Phaneropterinae
Tettigoniidae genera
Insects of Asia